La Quinta Formation is a geologic formation in Mexico. It is the oldest formation where Mexican amber can be found. It is from Late Oligocene to early Miocene. It is located at Simojovel, Chiapas, Mexico. It underlies the Mazantic Shale.

The Simojovel Group is from the Neogene and Paleogene.

Fossils recovered from the formation 
 Insects
 Hyptia deansi, a wasp
 Schwenckfeldina archoica, a fungus gnat
 Mastotermes electromexicus, a termite
 Termitaradus protera, a termite bug
 Aphaenogaster praerelicta, an ant
 Dicromantispa electromexicana, a mantifly
 Leptopharsa tacanae, a lace bug
 Plants
 Hymenaea mexicana, a legume
 Hymenaea allendis, a legume

See also 
 List of fossiliferous stratigraphic units in Mexico
 2017 in arthropod paleontology

References 

Geologic formations of Mexico
Oligocene paleontological sites of North America
Miocene paleontological sites of North America
Natural history of Chiapas